Sir Edward Tyrwhitt (1577 – 4 March 1628), of Stainfield, Lincolnshire, was an English politician.

He was a Member (MP) of the Parliament of England for Lincoln in 1604.

References

1577 births
1628 deaths
English knights
People from West Lindsey District
English MPs 1604–1611